Ballyedmonduff Wedge Tomb is a wedge-shaped gallery grave and a National Monument in Dún Laoghaire–Rathdown, Ireland.

Location

Ballyedmonduff Wedge Tomb is found on the south-eastern slope of the Two Rock mountain.

History

This is an early bronze age wedge tomb, circa 1700 BC, and was situated in a small clearing in a planted forest before the trees surrounding it were cut down in 2020.

The tomb was excavated in the 1830s and then again in the 1940s; during this excavation cremated bone, a polished stone hammer, flints and pottery were found. The tomb is U-shaped and features double-walling; the rectangular chamber is divided into three parts.

References

National Monuments in County Dublin
Tombs in the Republic of Ireland